The Gyumri Football Academy, is a modern football training school located in Armenia's 2nd-largest city of Gyumri, Shirak Province.

Overview
The construction of the academy was launched in late 2011 by the Football Federation of Armenia. On 13 September 2014, the complex was officially opened by the FFA president Ruben Hayrapetyan and the mayor of Gyumri Samvel Balasanian. The opening ceremony was attended by the President of Armenia Serzh Sargsyan.

Occupying an area of 80,000 m², the complex is home to:
5 natural-grass regular-sized football training pitches.
1 artificial turf regular-sized football training pitch.
1 artificial turf mini football training pitch.
Three-story service building with a total area of 1,200 m², including a fitness centre and spa, physiotherapy rooms, medical services, conference room, etc.

The academy is able to serve up to 1,000 trainees. All of the training pitches meet the professional standards set by FIFA and UEFA.

References

External links
Gyumri football academy at the official website of the Football Federation of Armenia

Football academies in Armenia
Football in Armenia
Association football training grounds in Armenia